= Little Einstein Science Museum =

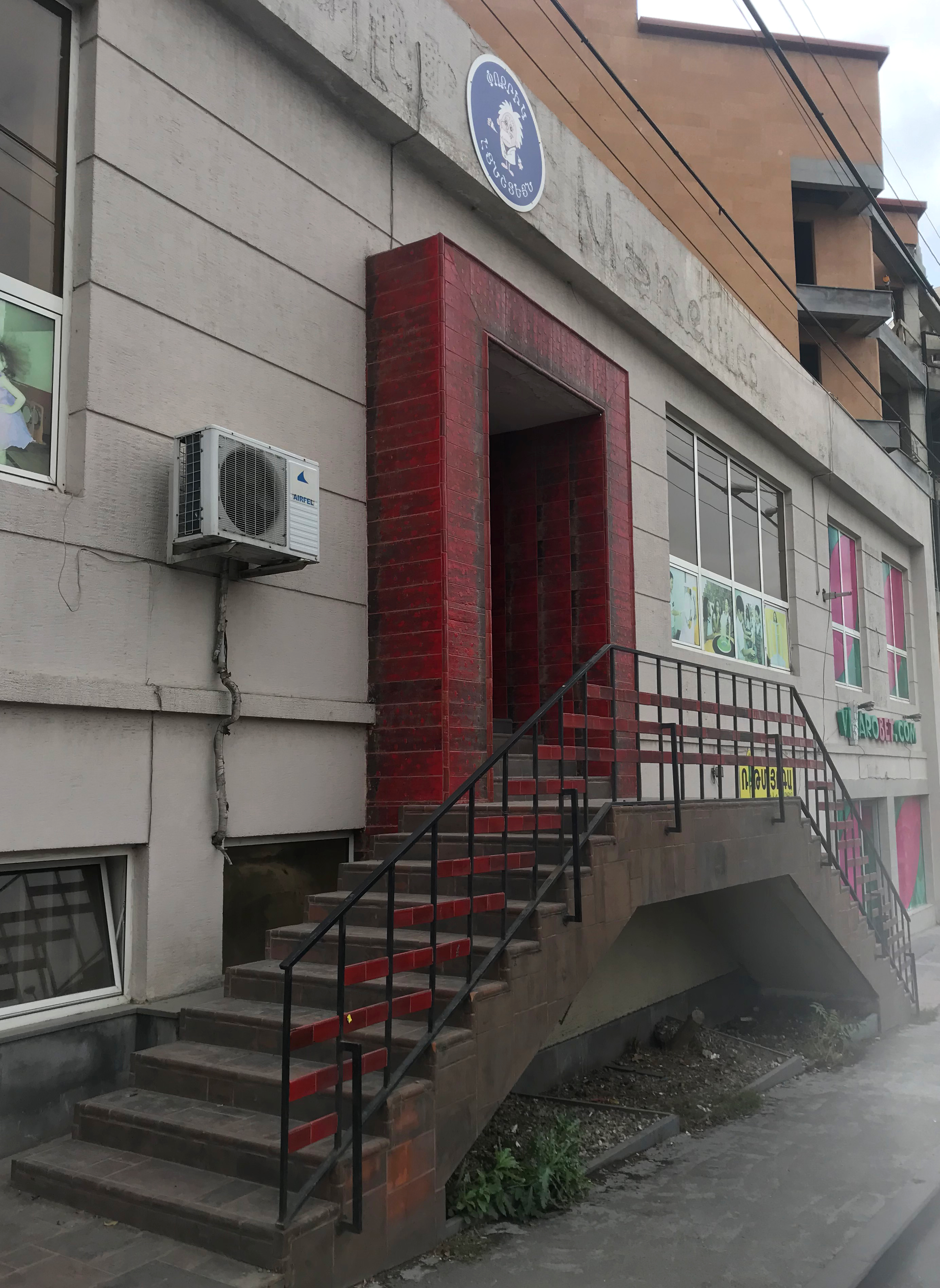
- Location: Yerevan, Armenia
- Type: Museum
- Founder: Marina Grigoryan

Little Einstein Science Museum is an interactive science museum in Yerevan which incorporates 25 exhibits of different scientific areas such as electricity, magnetism, optics, physics, mechanics, natural sciences, etc.

== History ==
The museum is for children aging seven or higher. Since the time of its inauguration in 2016, the founders of the museum have organized interactive show programs and established science centers. Here the children have been able to learn about different sciences through games and experiments as well as write scientific pieces.

== Exhibits ==
The museum has about 25 exhibits related to electricity, magnetism, optics, and mechanics which were brought from Russia and China. These exhibits have a practical use both in scientific areas and on a daily basis. They are envisaged for the children to be able to touch different physical phenomena while learning about them.

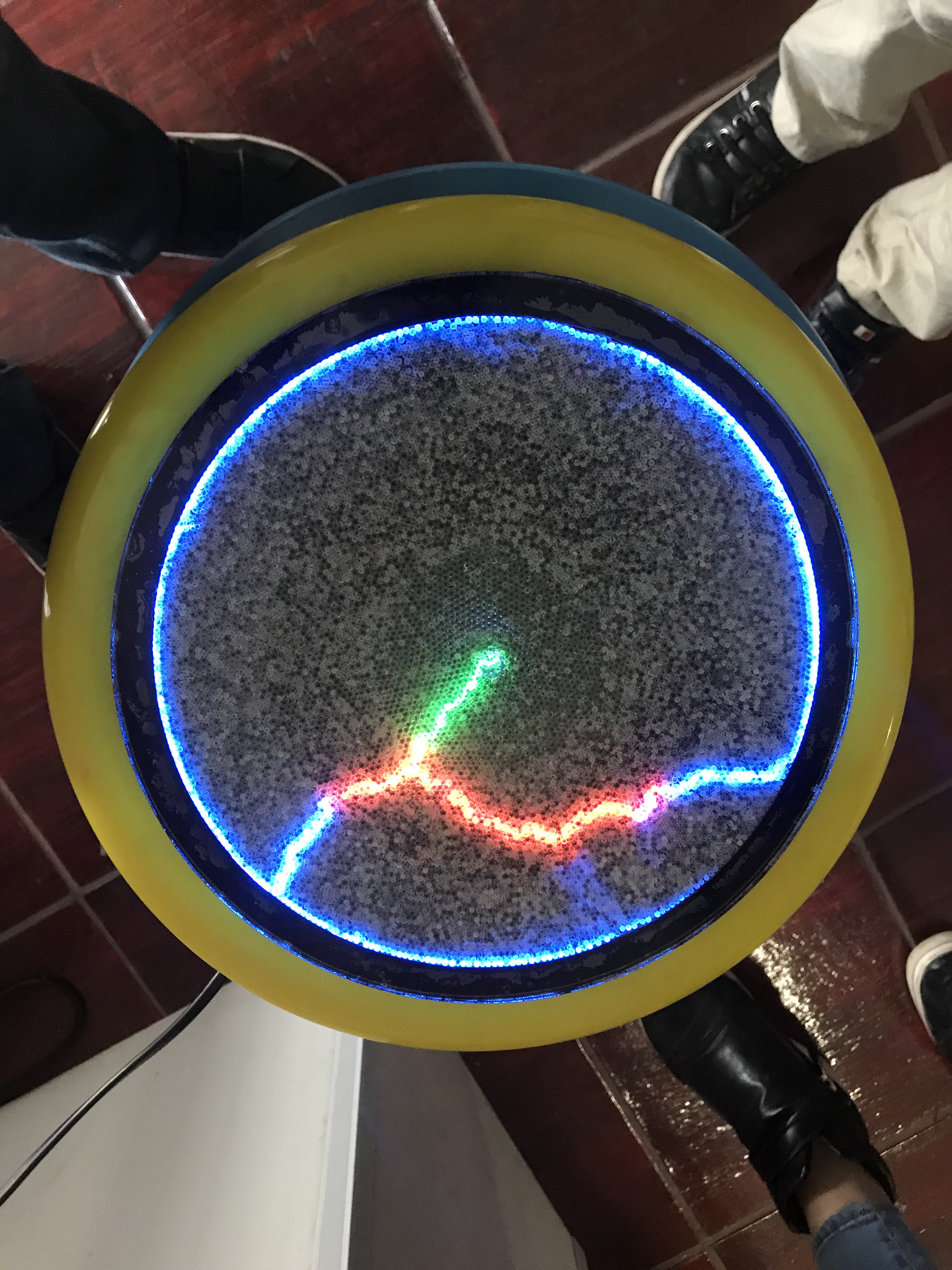

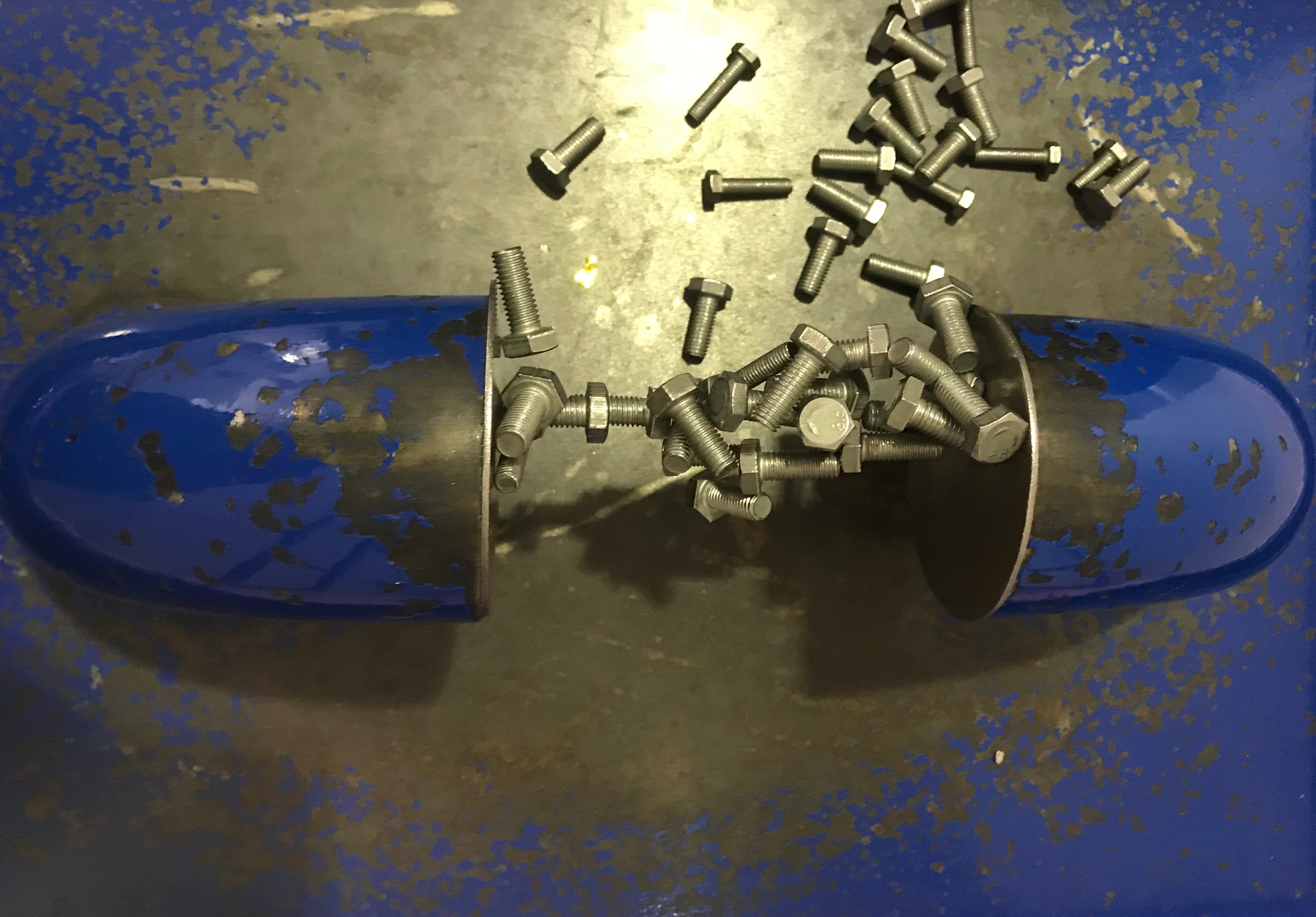

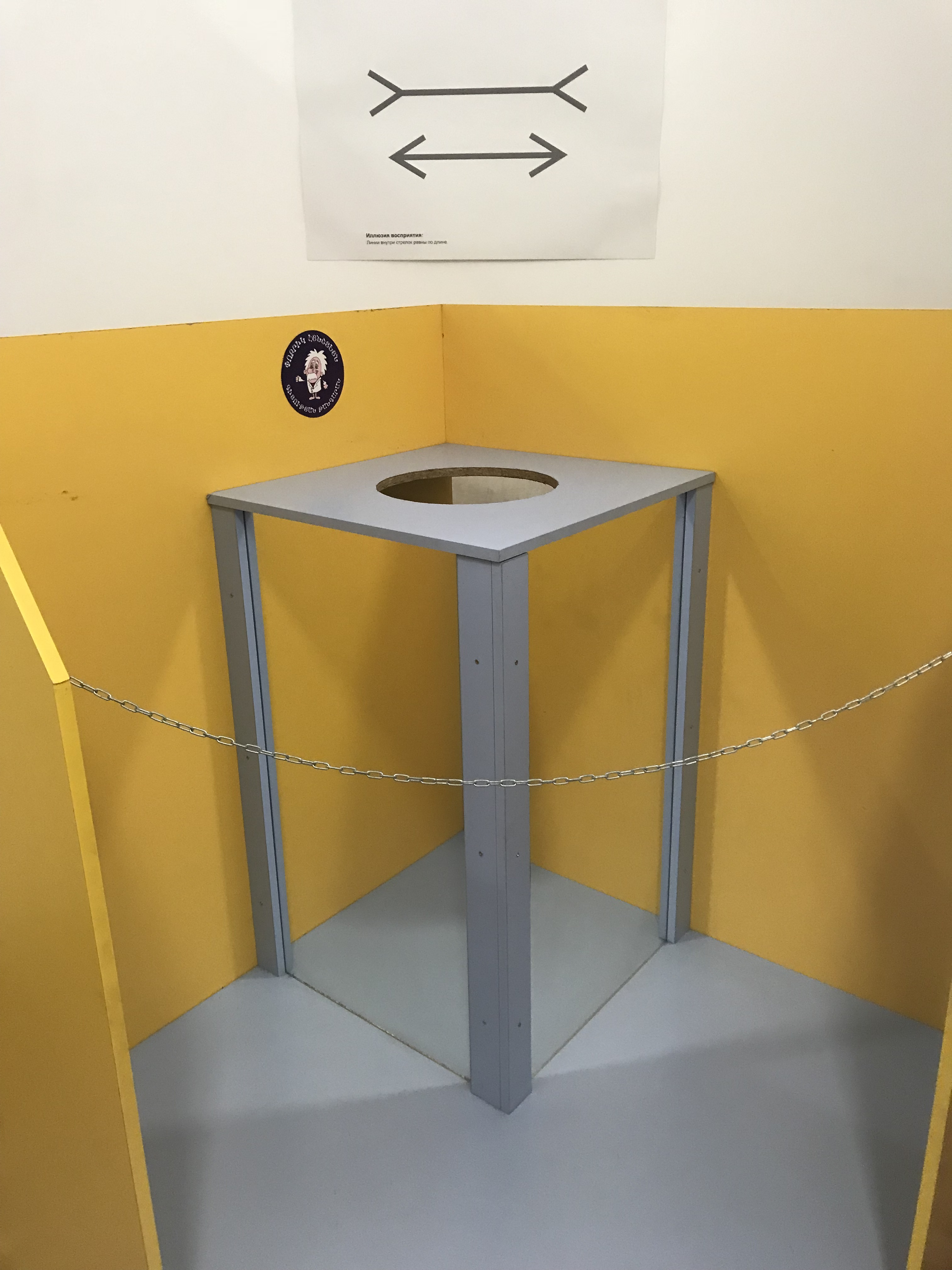

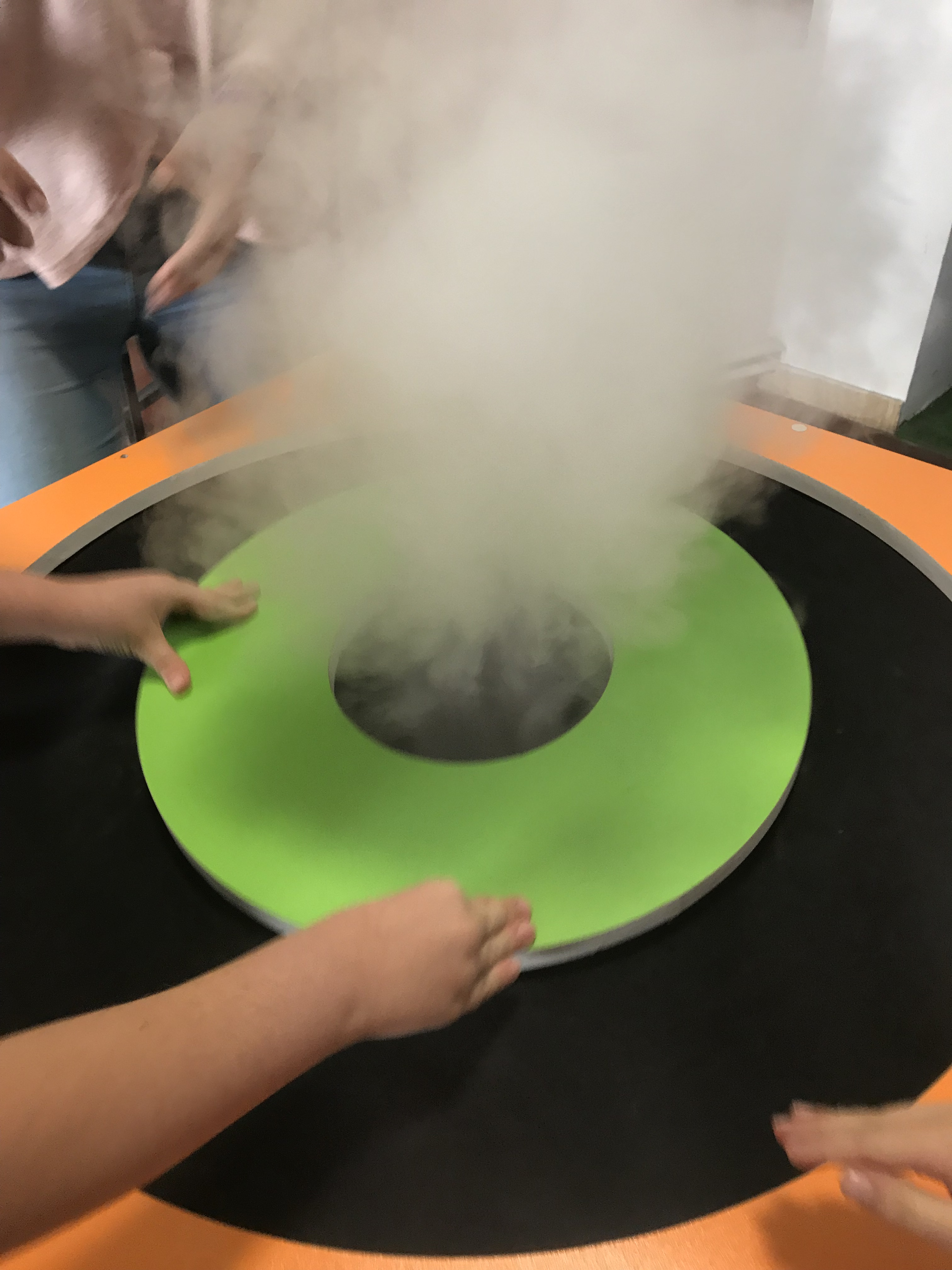

== Working Hours ==
- Monday – Friday 13:00-20:00
- Saturdays and Sundays 12:00-21:00
